Nancy Robertson (born 1949) is a diver from Saskatoon, Saskatchewan, Canada. She competed at the 1968 Summer Olympics in Mexico City and at the 1972 Summer Olympics Munich, with best result being 7th in platform diving. She won a gold medal at the 1971 Pan American Games, platform diving. She won a silver medal at the 1970 British Commonwealth Games.

References

Canadian female divers
Olympic divers of Canada
Divers at the 1968 Summer Olympics
Divers at the 1972 Summer Olympics
Sportspeople from Saskatoon
1949 births
Living people
Divers at the 1970 British Commonwealth Games
Commonwealth Games silver medallists for Canada
Pan American Games gold medalists for Canada
Commonwealth Games medallists in diving
Pan American Games medalists in diving
Divers at the 1971 Pan American Games
Medalists at the 1971 Pan American Games
20th-century Canadian women
Medallists at the 1970 British Commonwealth Games